The Democratic Regions Party (DBP, PHD) is a Kurdish political party in the Republic of Turkey. The pro-minority rights Peoples' Democratic Party (HDP) acts as the fraternal party to DBP.

Development 
After the 2014 municipal elections, Peoples' Democratic Party and the pro-Kurdish Peace and Democracy Party (BDP) were re-organised in a joint structure. On 28 April 2014, the entire parliamentary caucus of BDP joined HDP, whereas BDP was assigned exclusively to representatives on the local administration level. The BDP has been said to be more hardline, arguably with closer PKK links, than its parent HDP.

At the 3rd Congress of BDP on 11 July 2014, the name of the party was changed to the Democratic Regions Party and a new structure restricting the activities on the local/regional government level was adopted.

On 30 November 2019, Saliha Aydeniz became the Co-Chair of the party.

References

External links
Official Twitter Account 

2014 establishments in Turkey
Democratic socialist parties in Asia
Kurdish nationalism in Turkey
Kurdish nationalist political parties
Kurdish political parties in Turkey
Peoples' Democratic Congress
Political parties established in 2014
Political parties in Turkey
Social democratic parties in Turkey